Ed Davender (May 26, 1966 – April 28, 2016) was an American basketball player. He was a noted streetballer, and considered to be among the best New York shooting guards throughout his high school career. Initially Davender played at Alexander Hamilton High School in Brooklyn, where he averaged 29 points per game until the school closed down.  He transferred to Boys and Girls High School, where he became a McDonald's All-American and Parade All-American during his senior year. Davender played college basketball for the Kentucky Wildcats. He was selected by the Washington Bullets as the 60th overall pick in the 1988 NBA draft, but never played professionally.

In 2010, Davender was convicted of a basketball ticket scam and was sentenced to eight years in prison.  He died on April 30, 2016, as the result of a heart attack suffered days earlier.

References

1966 births
2016 deaths
American men's basketball players
Basketball players from New York City
Kentucky Wildcats men's basketball players
McDonald's High School All-Americans
Parade High School All-Americans (boys' basketball)
Point guards
Street basketball players
Washington Bullets draft picks
Sportspeople from Brooklyn